Col. James Cameron House is a historic home located at West Chillisquaque Township, Northumberland County, Pennsylvania.  It was built in four sections; a -story, formal brick section and a -story, brick kitchen were built between 1840 and 1842; a 2-story, brick addition was built about 1860; and a 1-story, wood-frame kitchen addition sometime in the mid- to late-19th century.  It is in a vernacular Federal style.  An Italianate style porch was added to the 2-story, brick section about 1860.  Also on the property is a contributing outbuilding dated to the mid-19th century.  The property was vested with the Milton Historical Society in 1981.

It was added to the National Register of Historic Places in 1989.

References

Houses on the National Register of Historic Places in Pennsylvania
Houses completed in 1842
Houses in Northumberland County, Pennsylvania
National Register of Historic Places in Northumberland County, Pennsylvania